Yancy Wideman Richmond (born July 16, 1980) is an American Christian musician, who plays worship and Christian pop music mainly focused towards a children's audience.

Early and personal life
Yancy was born Yancy LaDelle Wideman, on July 16, 1980, in Mississippi, to Jim and Julie Wideman (née, Spencer).She has a younger sister, and grew up in Tulsa, Oklahoma. She is married to Cory Richmond, and together they reside in Tennessee, with their children.

Music history
Her music recording career began in 1997, while she has since released a number of albums, with four of them getting reviews. They are Rock-N-Happy Heart (2008), Stars, Guitars & Megaphone Dreams (2010), Roots for the Journey (2013), and Little Praise Party: Taste and See (2014).

Discography
Albums
 Big Weather Change (1997)
 Rock-N-Happy Heart (2008)
 Stars, Guitars & Megaphone Dreams (2010)
 Roots for the Journey (2013)
 Little Praise Party: Taste and See (2014, with Friends)

References

External links
 

1980 births
American performers of Christian music
Living people
Singers from Mississippi
Singers from Oklahoma
Singers from Tennessee
Songwriters from Mississippi
Songwriters from Oklahoma
Songwriters from Tennessee
21st-century American singers
21st-century American women singers